Trichadenotecnum circularoides is a species of common barklouse in the family Psocidae. It is found in Africa, Europe and Northern Asia (excluding China), North America, South America, and Southern Asia.

References

Psocidae
Articles created by Qbugbot
Insects described in 1955